Hoskins Peak is a peak  west of Contact Peak in southern Pourquoi Pas Island, Graham Land, Antarctica. It was mapped by the Falkland Islands Dependencies Survey (FIDS) from surveys, 1956–59, and named by the UK Antarctic Place-Names Committee for Arthur K. Hoskins, a FIDS geologist at Stonington Island in 1958 and Horseshoe Island in 1959.

References

Mountains of Graham Land
Fallières Coast